Aleksandr Sergeyevich Khlebnikov (born 26 September 1984) is a former Russian professional football player.

Club career
He played 3 seasons in the Russian Football National League for FC Dynamo Bryansk, FC Volgar-Gazprom Astrakhan and FC Luch-Energiya Vladivostok.

External links
 
 

1984 births
Living people
Russian footballers
Association football defenders
FC Lukhovitsy players
FC Vityaz Podolsk players
FC Dynamo Vologda players
FC Dynamo Bryansk players
FC Volgar Astrakhan players
FC Luch Vladivostok players
FC Tyumen players